Chionodes petro is a moth in the family Gelechiidae. It is found in North America, where it has been recorded from California and Arizona.

The larvae feed on Sphaeralcea ambigua.

References

Chionodes
Moths described in 1999
Moths of North America